Steven Bernard Hill (born April 19, 1958), known professionally as Stevie B, is an American singer, songwriter, and record producer who was influential in the freestyle and hi-NRG dance music scene of the late 1980s, mostly in Miami. He had a 1990 number-one hit ballad, "Because I Love You (The Postman Song)".

Early life and career
Steven Bernard Hill was born on April 19, 1958 in Fort Lauderdale, Florida, He worked a variety of jobs – from car washing to fast food – before gaining recognition for his 1987 national club smash, "Party Your Body". It was also the title track of his 1988 debut LP, which eventually went gold. In 1989, he had his first top 40 hits with "I Wanna Be the One," "In My Eyes" and "Love Me For Life." With his 1990 album, Love & Emotion, he reached the height of his success, with the accompanying single, "Because I Love You" enjoying four weeks at number one on the U.S. Billboard Hot 100 in December 1990. He had two other top 15 hits from Love and Emotion with "I'll Be by Your Side" and the title track from the album.

In 1995, a quasi-greatest hits album was released by Universal Records in the Philippines, simply titled "Dream About You." It contained singles from his previous albums including "Funky Melody," "Running Back," and "Waiting for Your Love," among others. It also included as bonus the live version of "Because I Love You" which was recorded in his Tokyo concert, along with a ballad version of "If You Still Love Me." Two more tracks were added as bonus: "You're the One I Think About" and "Quiereme Por Vida." This album likewise featured 2 additional versions of "Dream About You," one with only synthesizers as accompaniment with no drums and percussion, and the other called 'Drop Mix' which prominently featured heavy bass guitar and bass drums.

In 1998, The Best of Stevie B was re-released, highlighting the light dance-pop sound that marked the start of his career.

In August 2009, he released The Terminator which features the lead single "Running for Miles" and a remixed rendition of one of his biggest hits, "Spring Love", with a guest performance by Pitbull and the music video featuring Polish model Anita Sikorska.

On April 10, 2019, Hill took to Facebook to make a critical commentary about the lack of freestyle music and the current state of the genre in general.

Personal life
On September 30, 2011, Hill was arrested by Springfield, Massachusetts police officers after his concert in MassMutual Center in Massachusetts due to his owing $420,000 in unpaid child support.

In a 2019 interview, comedian Dulcé Sloan revealed Hill to be her uncle.

Discography

Studio albums

Compilation albums
1991: Best of Stevie B
1992: Best of Stevie B (different track list)
1993: The Best of Stevie B (Brazil edition)
1996: The Best of Stevie B Vol. 2 (Brazil edition)
1996: Finally
1997: Hit Collection
1998: Best of Stevie B (reissued)
2001: The Greatest Hits
2004: The Greatest Hits Volume 2
2005: The World of Stevie B
2008: Greatest Freestyle Ballads
2009: B-Sides and Outtakes

Singles

Music videos

See also
List of artists who reached number one in the United States

Notes

References

External links
 Official Instagram page
 
 

1958 births
American freestyle musicians
20th-century African-American male singers
Living people
Musicians from Miami
Musicians from Fort Lauderdale, Florida
21st-century African-American people